Enéas Ferreira Carneiro (November 5, 1938 – May 6, 2007) was a Brazilian polymath, cardiologist, physicist, mathematician, professor, writer, military serviceman and politician. He represented the state of São Paulo in the National Chamber of Deputies (the lower house of the National Congress) and ran for presidency three times. He was founder and leader of the nationalist and conservative Party of the Reconstruction of the National Order (PRONA), which was usually seen as being far-right.

Early life 
Enéas was born and raised in Acre, in Brazil's far west. He lost his father at the age of nine and had to work to support his brothers and his mother. In 1958 he left Acre to begin studies in Rio de Janeiro, graduating in physics and mathematics. In 1959 he became an auxiliary anesthesiologist. In 1965 he received a medical degree from the Rio de Janeiro College of Medicine, with a specialty in cardiology. His academic pursuits, however, were not confined to medicine, and he has written articles on diverse subjects, including philosophy, logic and robotics. In 1980, he received a medical degree from the Cancer Hospital of Rio de Janeiro.

Political career 
In 1989 he established PRONA. In that same year he ran for the presidency in Brazil's first direct elections after the end of military rule. Under the electoral laws, every candidate was given a daily amount of free airtime to set out their agenda. As the amount of airtime was proportional to the candidate's party political size, PRONA only got roughly 15 seconds of airtime for each TV appearance. Nevertheless, he made the most of the opportunity. His exotic image – he was a small, bald man with a large beard and thick "coke-bottle" glasses — drew attention, as did his inflamed speech. In what would become his trademark, he finished it with the catchphrase Meu nome é Enéas ("My name is Enéas") — perhaps a gesture of humility or informality, or perhaps a way to save valuable time. The previously unknown politician was placed 12th out of a field of 21 candidates.

He returned in 1994, making use then of 1 minute and 17 seconds. Surprising political experts, he finished ahead of various established politicians, such as the then-governor of Rio de Janeiro (Leonel Brizola), the former governor of São Paulo (Orestes Quércia), and the then-governor of Santa Catarina (Esperidião Amin), with more than 4.6 million votes.

In 1998, Enéas got 35 seconds – less, in total airtime, than what he had in 1989 – to deliver a speech that was more nationalistic than ever. Its ideas, such as the construction of an atomic bomb, nationalization of Brazil's mineral resources, and increasing the military budget, sparked controversy. According to him, with such apparatus Brazil could impose its interests in the UN and other international treatises.

His project focused basically on education, believing that only a strong, interventionist and technical State would solve Brazil's problems. Although many may label him as an authoritarian, his political approach is similar to a social democracy like in Sweden and Finland for example, where the State is extremely important.

In 2000 he ran for mayor of the city of São Paulo, with no success, but he still managed to gain votes for the election of his councilman candidate Havanir Nimtz.

In 2002 he ran for a seat as a federal deputy, representing São Paulo, and secured the most-ever votes for that office. His party won enough votes, through the proportionality system, to elect five more deputies.

Enéas also participated actively in elections for mayors and councilmen in 2004, helping to choose councilmen in some major cities, such as Rio and São Paulo, and mayors in small cities.

In 2006 he was elected again as a federal deputy for São Paulo, this time with the third highest vote in the state.

Praise and criticism 
Many saw Enéas as an exotic politician because of his direct criticism to Brazilians fraudulent politicians behavior.  Enéas believed that by acting on TV what he called "the rage of the common citizen" would wake up Brazilian people against corrupt politicians.

Death 
Enéas underwent chemotherapy in a hospital for myeloid leukemia. When it became clear that his treatment was not resulting in improvements, he decided to return home, where he remained until his death. Enéas died on May 6, 2007, at approximately 2 pm, in the Laranjeiras neighborhood of southern Rio de Janeiro. His remains were cremated and his ashes scattered over the Bay of Guanabara.

After his death, on May 8, 2007, Enéas was honored in a rally against abortion in Brasília, on May 8, 2007. According to the Party of the Republic, the politician was one of the organizers of the event.

In 2017, the future President of Brazil Jair Bolsonaro proposed a bill to include Enéas' name in the Book of National Heroes.

See also 
 Brazilian nationalism
 Politics of Brazil

References

External links 
Learn more about Enéas' life, in the Chamber of Deputies of Brazil official website (in Portuguese)

Brazilian anti-communists
Brazilian nationalists
Brazilian cardiologists
Deaths from myeloid leukemia
Deaths from cancer in Rio de Janeiro (state)
1938 births
2007 deaths
Conservatism in Brazil
People from Rio Branco, Acre
Party of the Reconstruction of the National Order politicians
Candidates for President of Brazil
Members of the Chamber of Deputies (Brazil) from São Paulo
Far-right politics in Brazil